Ghost Ship Games ApS is a Danish video game developer and publisher based in Copenhagen. Founded in 2016, it is best known for developing Deep Rock Galactic.

History 
Ghost Ship Games was founded in the spring of 2016 by a team of five former employees of Press Play after that studio's closure. CEO Søren Lundgaard was invited to join the company shortly after by game director Mikkel Martin Pedersen. Lundgaard and Pedersen had previously been co-workers at the defunct game studio Deadline Games for over ten years and each of the six founders had had experience in studio management. The newly formed team begin work on a co-op title that they envisioned as "basically combining Minecraft and Left 4 Dead". In February 2017, Swedish developer Coffee Stain Studios acquired a 30% stake in Ghost Ship Games and agreed to publish their first game, Deep Rock Galactic.

Coffee Stain Publishing released Deep Rock Galactic into early access on 28 February 2018. Ghost Ship benefited from the community feedback that an early access model allowed for. Early reviews of the game were very positive and the game amassed 300,000 players by September 2018.  The game officially left early access after more than two years on 13 May 2020.

In August 2021, Coffee Stain's parent company Embracer Group acquired the remaining 70% of Ghost Ship Games, which made the studio a subsidiary of Coffee Stain Holding. In November 2021, Ghost Ship announced that Deep Rock Galactic had sold three million copies and would be ported to PlayStation 4 and PlayStation 5 in January 2022. In June 2022 they announced they had sold 4 million copies.

Ghost Ship Games announced a Publishing label for Danish game studios in February of 2023. The label's first three titles were subsequently announced as Deep Rock Galactic: Survivor (a single player spinoff of Deep Rock Galactic), SpellRogue and DarkSwarm.

Games developed

Games published

References

External links
 

2021 mergers and acquisitions
Companies based in Copenhagen
Danish companies established in 2016
Embracer Group
Video game companies established in 2016
Video game companies of Denmark
Video game development companies
Video game companies based in Copenhagen
Companies based in Copenhagen Municipality